Foghat are an English blues rock band from London. Formed in January 1971, the group originally included lead vocalist and rhythm guitarist "Lonesome" Dave Peverett, bassist and backing vocalist Tony Stevens, drummer Roger Earl (all recently departed from Savoy Brown) and lead guitarist Rod Price (formerly of Black Cat Bones). After four studio albums, Stevens left the band in late 1974 due to their heavy touring commitments, with multi-instrumentalist Nick Jameson (who had produced the group's fourth album Rock and Roll Outlaws) taking his place. By early 1976, Jameson had been replaced by Craig MacGregor. Price was the second original member of the band to leave in November 1980, following the touring cycle for their ninth studio album Tight Shoes. He was replaced the following year by Erik Cartwright.

MacGregor left the band in 1982 and was replaced by the returning Jameson. Kenny Aaronson took over in 1983, followed by Rob Alter, before MacGregor returned for a brief second tenure. By the end of 1984, Peverett had left to return to England, marking a temporary hiatus for the band. Earl, MacGregor and Cartwright continued performing under the name The Knee Tremblers with keyboardist and vocalist Jon Roberge, although by 1986 they had reverted to the Foghat moniker, adding new frontman Eric Burgeson. MacGregor had left again by the end of the year to pursue a solo career, with Cartwright's brother Brett and later Jeff Howell serving as his subsequent replacements. Burgeson was replaced by Phil Nudelman in 1988, who was later replaced by Billy Davis. Dave Crigger joined on bass in 1990.

In 1993, the original lineup of Foghat reunited for the first time since 1975. They released the band's first studio album in more than ten years, Return of the Boogie Men, the following year. The lineup remained stable until 1999, when Price left and was replaced by former Molly Hatchet guitarist Bryan Bassett. Peverett died on 7 February 2000 due to complications with cancer, after first being diagnosed in 1998. He was later replaced by former Humble Pie frontman Charlie Huhn, who was chosen by Peverett prior to his death. Stevens remained until early 2005, when he was replaced by the returning MacGregor. Price died on 22 March 2005 due to head trauma suffered as a result of a fall down a stairway. MacGregor was diagnosed with lung cancer in 2015 and died on 9 February 2018; Rodney O'Quinn replaced the bassist in 2015 and continues to perform with the band.

The lineup of Earl, Bassett, Huhn and O'Quinn would go on to record a live record in November 2019 called 8 Days on the Road. The album was released in July 2021.

In January 2022, lead singer Charlie Huhn retired. Scott Holt, formerly a guitarist for Buddy Guy, became the new lead singer and guitarist. Holt had previously lent his vocals for Under the Influence and was lead vocalist in Foghat side project Earl & the Agitators.

Members

Current

Former

Roger Earl's Foghat/The Kneetremblers members

Lonesome Dave's Foghat members

Timeline

Lineups

References

External links
Foghat official website

Foghat